Chironius multiventris, commonly known as the long-tailed machete savane, is species of colubrid snake.

Geographic range
It is found in Peru, northern Venezuela, Colombia in the Guainía and Trinidad and Tobago.

Description
The body is elongate, and strongly laterally compressed. The tail is long, as the common name implies. The dorsum is olive to light brown. There is a narrow whitish, black-edged, vertebral stripe. The upper labials and the ventrum are yellowish.

The ventrals are 178–183, and the subcaudals are 172–202. (Both these counts are higher than in C. carinatus.) The dorsal scales are arranged in 12 rows anteriorly and at midbody, in 10 rows posteriorly. (C. carinatus has 8 rows posteriorly.)

Diet
Chironius multiventris feeds on frogs.

Notes

References

multiventris
Reptiles of Venezuela
Reptiles of Trinidad and Tobago
Taxa named by Karl Patterson Schmidt
Reptiles described in 1943
Snakes of South America